Most Messed Up is the tenth studio album by American country/rock band Old 97's, first released on April 29, 2014 (see 2014 in music).

Track listing
All tracks by Rhett Miller, Ken Bethea, Murry Hammond and Philip Peeples except where noted.

"Longer Than You've Been Alive" - 5:52
"Give It Time" - 3:23
"Let's Get Drunk & Get It On" - 3:03
"This Is The Ballad" - 2:39
"Wheels Off" - 3:05
"Nashville" (Miller, Bethea, Hammond, Peeples, Jon McElroy) - 2:35
"Wasted" - 2:53
"Guadalajara" - 2:52
"The Disconnect" - 4:00
"Ex Of All You See" - 2:52
"Intervention" - 3:49
"Most Messed Up" - 2:48

Personnel 
Old 97's
Rhett Miller - lead vocals, acoustic guitar
Murry Hammond - bass, backing vocals
Ken Bethea - lead guitar
Philip Peeples - drums, percussion
Additional Musicians
Tommy Stinson - electric guitar, backing vocals
Jon Rauhouse - pedal steel

References

Old 97's albums
2014 albums
ATO Records albums